Denise Jones (born 11 December 1962) is a British gymnast. She competed in five individual events at the 1980 Summer Olympics with the best result of 23rd place all-around.

References

1962 births
Living people
British female artistic gymnasts
Olympic gymnasts of Great Britain
Gymnasts at the 1980 Summer Olympics
Place of birth missing (living people)
20th-century British women